The Treason Act 1800 (39 & 40 Geo.3 c.93) was an Act of the Parliament of the Kingdom of Great Britain. It assimilated the procedure on trials for treason and misprision of treason to the procedure on trials for murder in certain cases. It was passed as a result of an attempt on the life of George III by James Hadfield earlier that year. The Criminal Lunatics Act 1800 was passed at the same time.

The Act provided that in all cases of high treason which consisted of compassing or imagining the death of the king, or of misprision of that species of high treason, where the overt act (or acts) of that species of high treason alleged in the indictment for that offence was the assassination or killing of the King, or a direct attempt against his life, or a direct attempt against his person whereby his life might be endangered or his person might suffer bodily harm, the accused could be, and was to be, indicted, arraigned, tried and attainted, in same manner, and under the same procedure ("course and order of trial") and on the same evidence, as if he was charged with murder.

It further provided that nothing in the Treason Act 1695 or the Treason Act 1708 was to extend to any indictment for high treason consisting of compassing or imagining the death of the king, or for misprision of such treason, which alleged any of the overt acts specified above.

It further provided that nothing contained in the Act was to be construed to affect the penalty for treason fixed by law.

The provisions of the Act were amended and extended to all cases of treason and misprision of treason by section 1 of the Treason Act 1945; subject to a saving for the 1695 and 1708 Acts (s. 2(2)) and five separate repeals of words (s. 2(1)).

See also
High treason in the United Kingdom
Treason Act

References
The Statutes Revised. Third Edition. HMSO. 1950. Volume 2. Page 313.

Treason in the United Kingdom
Great Britain Acts of Parliament 1800